Ceratoscopelus is a genus of lanternfish.

Species 
There are currently three recognized species in this genus:
 Ceratoscopelus maderensis (R. T. Lowe, 1839) (Madeira lanternfish)
 Ceratoscopelus townsendi (C. H. Eigenmann & R. S. Eigenmann, 1889) (Dogtooth lampfish)
 Ceratoscopelus warmingii (Lütken, 1892) (Warming's lantern fish)

References 

Myctophidae
Extant Pliocene first appearances
Marine fish genera
Taxa named by Albert Günther